The Constituent National Assembly (South Korea) was the constituent assembly and the first National Assembly of the Republic of Korea, consisting of 200 members elected for the election on May 10, 1948. It was formed on 31 May 1948 and served for two years until 30 May 1950.

See also
List of members of the South Korean Constituent Assembly, 1948–50
1946 North Korean local elections
1947 North Korean local elections
People's Republic of Korea
National Assembly of Korea

References

1948 in South Korea
Allied occupation of Korea